is a self-taught Japanese photographer. His work often involves insects but he is a naturalist at heart.

References

External links
 J'Lit | Authors : Mitsuhiko Imamori | Books from Japan 

Japanese photographers
1954 births
Living people